Mide Funmi Martins is a Nollywood actress, model and a movie producer. She is the daughter of a veteran Nollywood actress, Funmi Martins who died of heart attack in 2002.

Early life and education 
She obtained her primary school from Community Grammar School, Ibadan and obtained her Secondary School Certificate from Providence Heights Secondary School, Fagba, Lagos after which she moved to Olabisi Onabanjo University, Ago Iwoye to receive a diploma in International Relations.

Career 
Mide Martins started her career after the death of her mother in 2002.   Since then, she has featured and produced several movies.

Personal life 
Mide Martins is the daughter of Funmi Martins. She is married to Afeez Owo and they are blessed with two Children.

Filmography 

 Makan  Je (2001) 
 Arewa (2003)
 Orejomi (2005)
 Kilebi Olorun (2007)
 Ife Owo (2008)
 Amoye (2008)
 Osas Omoge Benin (2012
 Omoge Lekki (2016)
 Ameerah (2021)
 Onitemi (2022)
 The wedding planner (2022)
 Iyawo Buga (2022)
 Haunted Pleasures (2022)

References 

Living people
Yoruba actresses
Nigerian film actresses
Nigerian female models
Olabisi Onabanjo University alumni
21st-century Nigerian actresses
Year of birth missing (living people)
Nigerian film producers
Nigerian women film producers